Sands School is a democratic school in Ashburton, Devon in England.

Background 
Sands School is the second democratic school in England which was started in 1987 by a group of students and teachers from the recently closed Dartington Hall School. Started in the kitchen of a parent's house, the school quickly established its own philosophy, building on the progressive principles of Dartington. The school's name, Sands, comes from the first letters of the first names of two of the founding teachers, Sean Bellamy and Sybilla Higgs: ‘S and S’, or 'Sands'.  This shortening came from the letters written by the school's other founding teacher, David Gribble, to Sean and Sybilla in the spring and summer of 1987.  The school grew from its original size of 17, and within six months had moved to a large town house in Ashburton where it is still based today.

Since 1991 it has been at the forefront of IDEC, the worldwide international democratic education movement, and has partner schools in Israel, Japan, U.S.A and most European countries. In 2006 the European branch of this movement was launched, EUDEC, and many Sands students are actively involved in promoting democratic approaches to education both in the private and state sector in the UK and abroad, travelling through Europe to conferences and events aimed at establishing democratic education as a viable alternative to the present educational model. In 2011 the school hosted a combined IDEC and EUDEC conference over ten days with more than 500 people attending from around the world.

Sands is a fee-paying day-school. It now has 70 students aged 11 to 17 and 10 teachers and 5 learning support staff. It offers a range of conventional qualifications including eleven GCSEs, (General Certificate of Secondary Education), BTEC Performing Arts, and LAMDA certificates, and offers students the chance to develop an approach to learning that is personalised and encourages critical thinking and creativity. The exams and lessons offer a medium for the development of open-minded and emotionally intelligent children. There are no uniforms.

Philosophy 
At the heart of the model is the idea that students should help design their place of learning and remain actively involved in the making of its rules and contributing to its philosophy; that students and teachers should be equal partners in the running of the school and that students should map their own route through their school careers with guidance from the adults. The result is a place where play is still important even to 16-year-olds, where talking and recreation are valued and students tend to be relaxed, happy and involved in class because they have made a conscious decision to attend. Children can choose what to learn, when to learn and how to learn. They are encouraged to take responsibility for their own learning.

Sands School is run by a weekly School Meeting, which is open to all students and staff and where each person present has one vote, and a School Council consisting of six elected students and an elected teacher; this group investigates and advises on daily events, feeding information back to the school meeting for decisions and action. It has no head teacher.

Praise of standard 

The school was inspected by Ofsted in November 2016 and in October 2013 and was found to be ‘Good’ overall with a number of ‘Outstanding’ features. No area of the provision was found to be less than "good" and all of the Statutory regulations (the school "Standards") were met in full. This is the same outcome as the previous inspection in 2010.

The latest report on Sands School gives a clear endorsement of their democratic approach to education. Taking part in decision-making process was observed to develop "exceptional qualities of thoughtfulness and the ability to offer balanced arguments". Good pupil achievements were found to be a "consequence of the democratic structures". Personal development was deemed to be "outstanding" because of the exceptional impact of the democratic principles. The inspector was particularly impressed with pupils’ behaviour, noting that "lessons took place in an atmosphere of mutual respect" and that "visitors were greeted with interest and impeccable manners".

External links 
Sands School
Phoenix Education Trust
Sands School (Movie) Made by a Sands School student, this project records the experiences of students and staff in democratic education and explores the running of Sands School.

References 

Democratic education
Private schools in Devon
Educational institutions established in 1987
Democratic free schools
1987 establishments in England